Roscoe Franklin "Duke" Cumberland (1913 – October 23, 1966) was a member of the Harlem Globetrotters. He averaged 6.9 points per game in the National Basketball League for the Chicago Studebaker Flyers.

See also

 The Harlem Globetrotters (film)

References

1913 births
1966 deaths
American men's basketball players
Basketball players from Ohio
Chicago Studebaker Flyers players
Dayton Metropolitans players
Dayton Rens players
Forwards (basketball)
Harlem Globetrotters players
Knoxville Bulldogs men's basketball players
New York Renaissance players
Sportspeople from Toledo, Ohio
20th-century African-American sportspeople